This is a list of S.E.F. Torres 1903 seasons

League and cup history

{|class="wikitable"
|-bgcolor="#efefef"
! Season
! Div.
! Pos.
! Pl.
! W
! D
! L
! GS
! GA
! P
!Domestic Cup
!colspan=2|Other
!Notes
|-bgcolor=PowderBlue
|align=center|1999–00
|align=center|Serie C2
|align=center bgcolor=gold|1
|align=center|34
|align=center|19
|align=center|10
|align=center|5
|align=center|56
|align=center|30
|align=center|67
|align=center|
|align=center|
|align=center|
|align=center bgcolor=lightgreen|Promoted
|-bgcolor=PowderBlue
|align=center|2000–01
|align=center|Serie C1
|align=center|7
|align=center|34
|align=center|14
|align=center|11
|align=center|9
|align=center|55
|align=center|45
|align=center|53
|align=center|
|align=center|
|align=center|
|align=center|
|-bgcolor=PowderBlue
|align=center|2001–02
|align=center|Serie C1
|align=center|11
|align=center|34
|align=center|11
|align=center|10
|align=center|13
|align=center|41
|align=center|35
|align=center|43
|align=center|
|align=center|
|align=center|
|align=center|
|-bgcolor=PowderBlue
|align=center|2002–03
|align=center|Serie C1
|align=center|12
|align=center|38
|align=center|9
|align=center|11
|align=center|14
|align=center|21
|align=center|34
|align=center|37
|align=center|
|align=center|
|align=center|
|align=center|
|-bgcolor=PowderBlue
|align=center|2003–04
|align=center|Serie C1
|align=center|13
|align=center|36
|align=center|9
|align=center|11
|align=center|14
|align=center|21
|align=center|28
|align=center|38
|align=center|
|align=center|
|align=center|
|align=center|
|-bgcolor=PowderBlue
|align=center|2004–05
|align=center|Serie C1
|align=center|13
|align=center|36
|align=center|10
|align=center|12
|align=center|14
|align=center|36
|align=center|43
|align=center|42
|align=center|
|align=center|
|align=center|
|align=center|
|-bgcolor=PowderBlue
|align=center|2005–06
|align=center|Serie C1
|align=center bgcolor=tan|3
|align=center|34
|align=center|12
|align=center|17
|align=center|5
|align=center|44
|align=center|32
|align=center|53
|align=center|
|align=center|
|align=center|
|align=center|
|-bgcolor=PowderBlue
|align=center|2006–07
|align=center|Serie C2
|align=center|12
|align=center|34
|align=center|10
|align=center|12
|align=center|12
|align=center|33
|align=center|39
|align=center|40
|align=center|
|align=center|
|align=center|
|align=center|
|-bgcolor=PowderBlue
|align=center|2007–08
|align=center|Serie C2
|align=center|13
|align=center|34
|align=center|13
|align=center|11
|align=center|10
|align=center|42
|align=center|34
|align=center|42
|align=center|
|align=center|
|align=center|
|align=center|
|-bgcolor=PowderBlue
|align=center|2008–09
|align=center|Serie E
|align=center bgcolor=silver|2
|align=center|30
|align=center|17
|align=center|6
|align=center|7
|align=center|55
|align=center|30
|align=center|57
|align=center|
|align=center|
|align=center|
|align=center|
|-bgcolor=PowderBlue
|align=center|2009–10
|align=center|Serie E
|align=center|10
|align=center|34
|align=center|10
|align=center|13
|align=center|11
|align=center|41
|align=center|36
|align=center|43
|align=center|
|align=center|
|align=center|
|align=center|
|-bgcolor=PowderBlue
|align=center|2010–11
|align=center|Serie E
|align=center bgcolor=silver|2
|align=center|34
|align=center|17
|align=center|13
|align=center|4
|align=center|59
|align=center|30
|align=center|64
|align=center|
|align=center|
|align=center|
|align=center|
|-bgcolor=PowderBlue
|align=center|2011–12
|align=center|Serie E
|align=center bgcolor=gold|1
|align=center|34
|align=center|28
|align=center|3
|align=center|3
|align=center|69
|align=center|17
|align=center|87
|align=center|
|align=center|
|align=center|
|align=center bgcolor=lightgreen|Promoted
|-bgcolor=PowderBlue
|align=center|2012–13
|align=center|Serie D
|align=center bgcolor=gold|1
|align=center|34
|align=center|18
|align=center|14
|align=center|2
|align=center|62
|align=center|30
|align=center|68
|align=center|
|align=center|
|align=center|
|align=center bgcolor=lightgreen|Promoted
|-bgcolor=PowderBlue
|align=center|2013–14
|align=center|Serie C2
|align=center|12
|align=center|34
|align=center|12
|align=center|11
|align=center|11
|align=center|40
|align=center|44
|align=center|47
|align=center|
|align=center|
|align=center|
|align=center|
|-bgcolor=PowderBlue
|align=center|2014–15
|align=center|Serie C2
|align=center|20
|align=center|38
|align=center|11
|align=center|14
|align=center|13
|align=center|35
|align=center|38
|align=center|47
|align=center|
|align=center|
|align=center|
|align=center bgcolor=red|Relegated
|-bgcolor=PowderBlue
|align=center|2015–16
|align=center|Serie D
|align=center bgcolor=tan|3
|align=center|34
|align=center|19
|align=center|9
|align=center|6
|align=center|64
|align=center|28
|align=center|62
|align=center|
|align=center|
|align=center|
|align=center|
|-bgcolor=PowderBlue
|align=center|2016–17
|align=center|Serie D
|align=center|16
|align=center|34
|align=center|6
|align=center|10
|align=center|18
|align=center|23
|align=center|58
|align=center|23
|align=center|
|align=center|
|align=center|
|align=center bgcolor=red|Relegated
|-bgcolor=PowderBlue
|align=center|2017–18
|align=center|Serie E
|align=center bgcolor=silver|2
|align=center|30
|align=center|15
|align=center|9
|align=center|6
|align=center|49
|align=center|22
|align=center|54
|align=center|
|align=center|
|align=center|
|align=center bgcolor=lightgreen|Promoted
|-bgcolor=PowderBlue
|align=center|2018–19
|align=center|Serie D
|align=center|15
|align=center|38
|align=center|12
|align=center|4
|align=center|22
|align=center|35
|align=center|59
|align=center|40
|align=center|
|align=center|
|align=center|
|align=center|
|-bgcolor=PowderBlue
|align=center|2019–20
|align=center|Serie D
|align=center bgcolor=tan|3
|align=center|26
|align=center|14
|align=center|9
|align=center|3
|align=center|44
|align=center|25
|align=center|51
|align=center|
|align=center|
|align=center|
|align=center|
|-bgcolor=PowderBlue
|align=center|2020–21
|align=center|Serie D
|align=center|15
|align=center|34	
|align=center|8
|align=center|10
|align=center|16
|align=center|31
|align=center|48
|align=center|34
|align=center|
|align=center|
|align=center|
|align=center|
|-bgcolor=PowderBlue
|align=center|2021–22
|align=center|Serie D
|align=center|
|align=center|
|align=center|	 	
|align=center|
|align=center|
|align=center|
|align=center|
|align=center|
|  style="text-align:center; background:silver"|Finalist
|align=center|
|align=center|
|align=center|
|}

References

External links 

 
 Historical Archives

 
S.E.F. Torres 1903
Seasons